Mount Oceanite is a conspicuous ice-covered mountain (probably an extinct volcano) rising to  in the extreme southeast corner of Montagu Island, South Sandwich Islands. The name applied by United Kingdom Antarctic Place-Names Committee (UK-APC) in 1971 refers to the oceanite lavas present in this area, which occur nowhere else in the South Sandwich Islands.

References

External links

Oceanite, Mount